Mark Gleghorne (born 19 May 1985) is a field hockey player from Northern Ireland who has represented Ireland, England and Great Britain at international level. He represented Great Britain at the 2016 Summer Olympics. Gleghorne was a member of the England teams that won the bronze medals at the 2014 and 2018 Commonwealth Games and at the 2017 Men's EuroHockey Nations Championship. He also represented England at the 2014 and 2018 Men's Hockey World Cups. At club level, Gleghorne was a member of the Instonians team that won the Irish Senior Cup in both 2002 and 2004. He was also a member of the Punjab Warriors team that won the 2016 Hockey India League title. Gleghorne is a member of a family of field hockey internationals. His younger brother, Paul, is an Ireland international. Two of his aunts, Margaret Gleghorne and Jackie McWilliams, were also Ireland and Great Britain women's internationals.

Early years, family and education
Gleghorne was born into a field hockey family. His father, Andy, was a player and club secretary at Antrim Hockey Club while his mother, Anne, played with and coached Randalstown. Anne Gleghorne died in 2003. His younger brother, Paul, is an Ireland international. Two of his aunts, Margaret Gleghorne and Jackie McWilliams, were also Ireland and Great Britain women's internationals. Between 1996 and 2003 he attended Royal Belfast Academical Institution. Between 2004 and 2007 he attended Loughborough University and gained a degree in Sport Science. He is also a qualified PE teacher. In addition to field hockey, in his youth Gleghorne played association football, rugby union and cricket. He played cricket for Muckamore Cricket Club and was also member of Ireland teams that won under-15 and under-17 European championships in 2000 and 2001. His teammates included, among others, Eoin Morgan, William Porterfield, Kevin O'Brien, Boyd Rankin and Gary Wilson.

Domestic teams

RBAI
In 2002–03 Gleghorne captained the Royal Belfast Academical Institution team that won the Burney Cup and finished as runners-up in the All Ireland Schoolboys Hockey Championship. His teammates included Michael Watt.

Instonians
Gleghorne began playing for Instonians while still attending RBAI. His teammates at Instonians included his brother, Paul. Gleghorne was a member of the Instonians team that won the Irish Senior Cup in both 2002 and 2004. In the 2002 final, against Pembroke Wanderers, he scored a bizarre goal. His shot was originally going wide before it rebounded off an umpire. In the 2004 final Instonians defeated Cork Harlequins. After graduating from Loughborough University, he re-joined Instonians for the 2008–09 season. While playing for Instonians, Gleghorne also represented Ulster at interprovincial level.

Men's England Hockey League
Gleghorne has played for several clubs in the Men's England Hockey League. While attending Loughborough University between 2004 and 2007, he played for Loughborough Students' Hockey Club. After spending the 2009–10 season playing for HC Den Bosch in the Hoofdklasse, he re-joined Loughborough. He subsequently joined East Grinstead, representing the club in the 2014–15 Euro Hockey League. In 2015 he moved to Beeston. In 2019 he started playing for Holcombe.

Hockey India League
Gleghorne has also played in the Hockey India League. In 2014 he played for Mumbai Magicians. At the 2014 auction he was initially selected as a replacement. However, due to injuries he was subsequently called up to play the season. The 2016 and 2017 seasons saw him play for Punjab Warriors. He helped Warriors win the 2016 title.

International

Ireland
Between 2004 and 2008 Gleghorne made 80 senior appearances for Ireland. He was a member of the Ireland team that won the 2005 Men's EuroHockey Nations Trophy. He also represented Ireland at the 2006 Men's Intercontinental Cup and at the 2007 Men's EuroHockey Nations Championship. At the 2008 Men's Field Hockey Olympic Qualifier he finished the tournament as top scorer. In 2009 Gleghorne informed the Irish Hockey Association that he was switching allegiances from Ireland to England/Great Britain.

Great Britain
Having previously played for Ireland, Gleghorne had to wait for three years before he was eligible to play for Great Britain. He eventually made his debut for Great Britain in November 2011, scoring in a 3–1 win against Belgium. He subsequently represented Great Britain at the 2016 Summer Olympics and when they won the 2017 Sultan Azlan Shah Cup.

England
Gleghorne was a member of the England teams that won the bronze medals at the 2014 and 2018 Commonwealth Games. He was also a member of the England team that won the bronze at the 2017 Men's EuroHockey Nations Championship, scoring in the third place play-off against Germany. Gleghorne also represented England at the 2014 and 2018 Men's Hockey World Cups.

Honours
Great Britain
Sultan Azlan Shah Cup
Winners: 2017
Men's Four Nations Cup
Runners up: 2016
England
Men's Hockey Investec Cup
Winners: 2014
Sultan Azlan Shah Cup
Runners up: 2018
Hockey Champions Trophy
Runners up: 2012
Ireland
Men's EuroHockey Nations Trophy
Winners: 2005
Punjab Warriors
Hockey India League
Winners: 2016: 1
Instonians
Irish Senior Cup
Winners: 2001–02, 2003–04: 2
RBAI
Burney Cup
Winners: 2002–03: 1
All Ireland Schoolboys Hockey Championship
Runners up: 2002–03: 1

References

External links
 
 
 
 
 

1985 births
Living people
English male field hockey players
British male field hockey players
Ireland international men's field hockey players
Male field hockey players from Northern Ireland
Irish male field hockey players
Field hockey players at the 2014 Commonwealth Games
Field hockey players at the 2018 Commonwealth Games
Field hockey players at the 2016 Summer Olympics
2014 Men's Hockey World Cup players
2018 Men's Hockey World Cup players
Olympic field hockey players of Great Britain
Commonwealth Games bronze medallists for England
Commonwealth Games medallists in field hockey
Male field hockey defenders
Male field hockey forwards
Instonians field hockey players
Loughborough Students field hockey players
Beeston Hockey Club players
East Grinstead Hockey Club players
Holcombe Hockey Club players
HC Den Bosch players
Men's England Hockey League players
Hockey India League players
Men's Hoofdklasse Hockey players
Expatriate field hockey players
Expatriate sportspeople from Northern Ireland in the Netherlands
Irish expatriate sportspeople in England
Expatriate sportspeople from Northern Ireland in India
Sportspeople from Ballymena
Irish cricketers
Cricketers from Northern Ireland
Schoolteachers from Northern Ireland
People educated at the Royal Belfast Academical Institution
Alumni of Loughborough University
Medallists at the 2014 Commonwealth Games
Medallists at the 2018 Commonwealth Games